The Platt Music Corporation, founded by Benjamin Platt in 1905, was a national retailer specializing in selling consumer electronics goods through leased operations in 135 department stores including Marshall Field's, Bloomingdale's, The May Department Stores Company and Emporium-Capwell.

Platt Music Corporation, where Herman Platt, (1909–2005), son of Benjamin Platt served as president and CEO from 1956 until 1984, was a private company that leased space in department stores such as The May Department Stores Company, otherwise known as Robinsons-May, and sold consumer electronic products. Platt Music Corporation was also the first company to carry Toshiba in the United States. In 1984, Michael Glazer became chairman and chairman executive of Platt Music. Tom Bagan, president and COO of Chicago retail giant Marshall Field's became president and COO of The Platt Music Corporation. The company started trading publicly on the Stock Exchange in 1984. National operations ended in 1988.
Members of the Platt Family have lived in Los Angeles since the 19th century. TV presenter Josh Flagg is the great-grandson of its founder.
The Platt Music Company Building, constructed in 1927 and designed by architects Walker + Eisen, was located at 834 S. Broadway in downtown Los Angeles.

References

External links
Platt Music Corporation stock certificate at Scripophily.net

Consumer electronics retailers in the United States
Retail companies based in California
Companies based in Los Angeles
Defunct retail companies of the United States
Defunct companies based in Greater Los Angeles
American companies established in 1905
Retail companies established in 1905
Retail companies disestablished in 1988
1905 establishments in California
1988 disestablishments in California